is the second EP released by Chara, which was released on September 24, 2008 (two months after her 12th original album, Honey). It was her first EP marketed as a mini-album as opposed to a single. It debuted at #30 on the Japanese Oricon album charts, and charted in the top 300 for six weeks.

The EP comprises three covers and two versions of one original song.  was used as the theme song for the film version of the novel . The song Kiss is a different version of Kieru, featuring the same arrangement but different lyrics. The lyrics of both songs were written in collaboration with Snakes and Earrings author Hitomi Kanehara, with Kanehara primarily writing Kieru and Chara primarily writing Kiss.

Tomorrow was used in Astellas Pharma commercials. Time After Time, a duet with Super Butter Dogs vocalist Hanaregumi, had already been released on the 2008 compilation album We Love Cyndi – Tribute to Cyndi Lauper released two months prior.

Music video

A music video for the title track Kiss was created, and shot by Fumiko Hirano. It is a grayscale film, depicting Chara with a lover at a windy beach. The couple embrace and lightly caress each other, through wide camera arcs. A minute and a half into the video, they slowly begin to kiss. The scene is interspersed with other scenes of the pair caressing. The pair watch an offshore tornado arrive, and are covered in written paper notes. Objects float by in the distance, such as a motorcycle and a house. A door floats down to them, showing a different sunlit beach through it.

As of December 10, 2009 the music video for Kiss has been viewed 148,000 times at the two official Universal channels on popular video-sharing website YouTube.

Track listing

Japan Sales Rankings

References

Chara (singer) EPs
2008 EPs
Japanese-language EPs